The 1939 Cal Poly Mustangs football team represented California Polytechnic School—now known as California Polytechnic State University, San Luis Obispo—as an independent during the 1939  college football season. Led by seventh-year head coach Howie O'Daniels, Cal Poly compiled a record of 4–4–1. The team was outscored by its opponents 101 to 78 for the season. The Mustangs played home games at Mustang Stadium in San Luis Obispo, California.

Cal Poly was a two-year school until 1941 and competed as an independent from 1929 to 1945.

Schedule

Notes

References

Cal Poly
Cal Poly Mustangs football seasons
Cal Poly Mustangs football